The 2006 Illinois Fighting Illini football team represented the University of Illinois in the 2006 NCAA Division I FBS football season. The team's head coach was Ron Zook, who was in his second season with the Illini. Illinois had a record of 2–10, their second consecutive season with only two wins. However, unlike the previous year, they suffered few blowout losses and played competitively with the Big Ten powerhouses, including eventual conference champion Ohio State to whom Illinois lost 17–10 on November 4.

Schedule

Roster

References

Illinois
Illinois Fighting Illini football seasons
Illinois Fighting Illini football